Kardemir power station or Karabük power station is a small coal-fired power station in Turkey (not to be confused with the gas-fired power station owned by the same company) in Karabük Province owned by Kardemir iron and steel company.

References

External links 

 Kardemir Karabük Demir Çelik power station on Global Energy Monitor

Coal-fired power stations in Turkey